Valparaiso is a city in Okaloosa County, Florida, United States. As of the 2010 census, the city population was 5,036. According to the U.S. Census Bureau's 2018 estimates, the city had a population of 5,195. It is part of the Fort Walton Beach–Crestview–Destin Metropolitan Statistical Area.

History
Valparaiso was named after Valparaiso, Indiana (which was named after Valparaiso, Chile) and is a twin city also with its neighboring city, Niceville.

Chicago businessman James E. Plew, who relocated to the panhandle of northwest Florida in 1922, became "one of Northwest Florida's pioneer developers," and settled on Valparaiso "as the most likely spot for development. 

He founded the Bank of Valparaiso, constructed the Valparaiso Inn [in 1924], organized the Chicago Country Club which constructed the Valparaiso Country Club golf course and was instrumental in many other development activities in the community."

"Other interests of Mr. Plew included the founding of the Shalimar Winery, which was established to use the surplus grape crop of the county. He also founded the Valparaiso Novelty Company, helped to establish a knitting mill in the community and was interested in a number of other enterprises to which he made investments to help their development."

Plew thought that a military payroll would boost the depression-stricken economy of the region. He leased from the city of Valparaiso the Valparaiso Airport, an arrowhead-shaped parcel of  cleared in 1933 as an airdrome. 

In 1934, Plew offered the U.S. government  contiguous land for a bombing and gunnery base. This leasehold became the headquarters for the Valparaiso Bombing and Gunnery Base activated on June 14, 1935, under the command of Captain Arnold H. Rich. This was the founding of Eglin Air Force Base. The field was assigned the ICAO airport code VPS for Valparaiso, which Destin-Fort Walton Beach Airport retains to this day. In Niceville, there is an elementary school named in his honor.

Geography

Valparaiso is located at  (30.5070, –86.4970).

Climate
The climate is characterized by relatively high temperatures and evenly distributed precipitation throughout the year. Temperatures are high and can lead to warm, humid nights. Summers are usually somewhat wetter than winters, with much of the rainfall coming from convectional thunderstorm activity. The Köppen Climate Classification subtype for this climate is "Cfa" (Humid Subtropical Climate).

Demographics

As of the census of 2000, there were 6,408 people, 1,928 households, and 1,284 families residing in the city. The racial makeup of the city was 80.77% White, 9.91% African American, 0.64% Native American, 2.67% Asian, 0.11% Pacific Islander, 3.00% from other races, and 2.90% from two or more races. Hispanic or Latino of any race were 9.18% of the population.

There were 1,928 households, out of which 30.6% had children under the age of 18 living with them, 52.1% were married couples living together, 10.4% had a female householder with no husband present, and 33.4% were non-families. 28.1% of all households were made up of individuals, and 8.5% had someone living alone who was 65 years of age or older.  The average household size was 2.36 and the average family size was 2.87.

In the city the population was spread out, with 16.8% under the age of 18, 20.1% from 18 to 24, 31.9% from 25 to 44, 20.3% from 45 to 64, and 10.8% who were 65 years of age or older.  The median age was 34 years. For every 100 females, there were 164.7 males.  For every 100 females age 18 and over, there were 181.6 males.

The median income for a household in the city was $39,521, and the median income for a family was $46,411. Males had a median income of $22,267 versus $18,781 for females. The per capita income for the city was $19,934.  About 3.1% of families and 6.7% of the population were below the poverty line, including 8.7% of those under age 18 and 5.4% of those age 65 or over.

Arts and culture

Museums and other points of interest
The Heritage Museum of Northwest Florida is located in Valparaiso.

Infrastructure

Transportation
Commercial aircraft fly into nearby Destin-Fort Walton Beach Airport, which also serves the cities of Destin and Fort Walton Beach. Located within Eglin Air Force Base, the airport code VPS is taken from the city of Valparaiso, which is adjacent to the base.

References

External links
 
 City of Valparaiso Florida Website Portal style website, Government, Business, Library, Recreation and more
 Northwest Florida Daily News
 City-Data.com Comprehensive Statistical Data and more about Valparaiso

Cities in Okaloosa County, Florida
Populated places on the Intracoastal Waterway in Florida
1920s establishments in Florida
Populated places established in the 1920s
Cities in Florida